The 2007 Shanghai Masters was the inaugural edition of the Shanghai Masters snooker tournament and the first ranking event of the 2007/2008 season. It took place between 6–12 August 2007 at the Shanghai Grand Stage in Shanghai, China.

Dominic Dale won in the final 10–6 against Ryan Day.

Tournament summary
 Ronnie O'Sullivan withdrew from the event due to back problems that prevented him from travelling or playing.
 Matthew Stevens went 0–4 down to Stephen Maguire, but took the next 5 frames to win 5–4.
 Dominic Dale won 8 consecutive frames in the final, claiming victory from trailing 2–6. He also dyed his hair blonde halfway through the tournament because he saw the style in a barbershop in Shanghai.

Prize fund
The breakdown of prize money for this year is shown below: 

Winner: £48,000
Runner-up: £22,500
Semi-final: £12,000
Quarter-final: £6,500
Last 16: £4,275
Last 32: £2,750
Last 48: £1,725
Last 64: £1,325

Stage one highest break: £500
Stage two highest break: £2,000
Stage one maximum break: £1,000
Stage two maximum break: £20,000
Total: £250,000

Wildcard round
A wildcard round was held on the opening day of the tournament before the first round proper to allow eight Chinese players to display their abilities. Matches in this round were best of 9 frames.

Main draw

Final

Qualifying
Qualifying rounds for the Shanghai Masters took place at Pontin's, Prestatyn, Wales, between 26 and 29 June 2007.

Century breaks

Main stage centuries
143, 127, 116, 102  Dominic Dale
133, 123  Ian McCulloch
131, 104  Mark Selby
126  Adrian Gunnell
124, 106  Stephen Maguire
115, 106, 105, 103  Ryan Day
108  Stuart Bingham
102  Michael Holt
101  Shaun Murphy

Qualifying stage centuries

140  Dave Harold
138  Fergal O'Brien
137  Barry Pinches
136  Patrick Wallace
136  David Roe
133  Ricky Walden
131  Alfie Burden
130  Scott MacKenzie
129, 101  Dominic Dale
128, 127  Supoj Saenla
127  Rory McLeod
123  David Gilbert
122  Robert Milkins

116  Tony Drago
115, 103  Jamie Burnett
115  Marco Fu
112  Adrian Gunnell
110  Matthew Stevens
110 Jimmy White
109, 101  David Gray
105, 103  Judd Trump
105  Jamie Cope
103, 103  Michael Judge
103  Joe Perry
102  Jamie O'Neill
101  Stuart Pettman

References

Shanghai Masters (snooker)
Shanghai Masters
Shanghai Masters